Tai Tuisamoa (born 28 August  1980) is an American professional rugby union player. He played as a lock for the San Diego Legion in Major League Rugby and previously for the San Diego Breakers in PRO Rugby and London Scottish in the RFU Championship as well as for the United States internationally.

References

1980 births
Living people
American rugby union players
Rugby union locks
San Diego Legion players
United States international rugby union players